The 2022–23 Al Ittihad Alexandria Club season is the club's 109th season in existence and the 52nd consecutive season in the top flight of Egyptian football. In addition to the domestic league, Al Ittihad are participating in this season's editions of the Egypt Cup and the EFA Cup.

Overview 
On 6 September, the Al Ittihad Alexandria announced the new coach, Zoran Manojlović, in preparation for the new season.

Players

First-team squad

Transfers

In

Out

Pre-season and friendlies

Competitions

Overview

Egyptian Premier League

League table

Results summary

Results by round

Matches 
The league fixtures were announced on 9 October 2022.

Egypt Cup

EFA Cup

References 

Al Ittihad Alexandria Club seasons
Al Ittihad